The World Group II was the second highest level of Fed Cup competition in 2019. The winning nations advanced to the World Group Play-offs, and the losing nations were relegated to the World Group II Play-offs.

Switzerland vs. Italy

Latvia vs. Slovakia

Japan vs. Spain

Netherlands vs. Canada

References 

World Group II